The National Music Conservatory (NMC) is a music school in Amman, Jordan.

NMC was established by the Noor Al Hussein Foundation in 1986. It is an institution for the development of musicians and the promotion of music appreciation in Jordan.

See also
 JOrchestra (formerly the Amman Symphony Orchestra)

References

External links
 NMC website

1986 establishments in Jordan
Organizations established in 1986
Music schools in Asia
Music organisations based in Jordan
Educational organisations based in Jordan
Organisations based in Amman
Education in Amman